Erika Gulyás is a Hungarian politician who served as spokesperson of the Hungarian government from 2 August 2004 to 6 October 2004.

References
 Gulyás Erika az új kormányszóvivő

Living people
21st-century Hungarian women politicians
Hungarian journalists
Hungarian women journalists
Government spokespersons of Hungary
Year of birth missing (living people)
Place of birth missing (living people)